Robert Sherrick Brumbaugh (December 2, 1918 – July 14, 1992) was an American philosopher and a professor of medieval philosophy at Yale University. He was a president of the Metaphysical Society of America.

Works

 1962-73. Plato manuscripts: a catalogue of microfilms in the Plato microfilm project, Yale University Library. New Haven. .
 1973. Plato on the one: the hypotheses in the Parmenides. Port Washington, N.Y.: Kennikat. .
 1975. Ancient Greek gadgets and machines. Westport: Greenwood Press. .
 1978. The most mysterious manuscript: the Voynich 'Roger Bacon' cipher manuscript. Carbondale [etc.]; London [etc.: Southern Illinois University Press ; Feffer and Simons. . .
 1992. Western philosophic systems and their cyclic transformations. Carbondale: Southern Illinois University Press. .
 1997. Unreality and time. Albany, N.Y.: State University of New York Press. . .
 2018. Plato for the Modern Age. Chicago: Muriwai Books. . .

References

20th-century American philosophers
Philosophy academics
1918 births
1992 deaths
Presidents of the Metaphysical Society of America
Place of birth missing
Place of death missing
Yale University faculty